Johann Georg Holtzhey (1729, Amsterdam – 1808, Amsterdam), was an 18th-century Dutch medallist and mint master.

Biography
According to the Netherlands Institute for Art History (RKD) he was the son of Martin Holtzhey, master of the mint in Gelderland and Middelburg. He took over his father's workshop in Amsterdam in 1749 when his father accepted his duties as "muntmeester" (mint master). He became mint master of the Utrecht mint, and became the teacher of the medallists David van der Kellen and Hendrik Lageman.

Work for Dutch honorary societies: Teylers Stichting
He made a name for himself designing and striking medals for Dutch honorary societies, and kept the presses for these societies, striking medals on request and engraving the names of the prize winners himself. On his death the presses were often purchased back at great expense by the societies. The Teylers Stichting (English: Teylers Foundation) had him design a prize medal in 1778 that is still used. At 1000 guilders the manufacture of the coin stamps was costly -a consequence of the size of the medals, which matched the ambitions of the new Foundation. Another receipt in the archive of Teylers Stichting testifies to the great care Holtzhey took when sending the medals, which were securely packed in wool to protect them from shaking. After Holtzhey's death the Foundation purchased the stamp press for the Teylers prize medal from the Holtzhey estate for 100 guilders.

Work for John Adams
In 1782 Holtzhey designed two medals for John Adams, one to celebrate the Dutch acknowledgement of the independence of the Thirteen Colonies on April 19, 1782, and one to celebrate the trade treaty with the Netherlands on October 8, 1782.
The face of the medal celebrating independence is in the collection of the Teylers Museum and declares “Libera Soror,” or “A Free Sister,” and depicts the Netherlands Maiden on the left as an armed woman and the United States on the right as a Native American woman. Holland uses a staff to place a Phrygian cap upon America's head, while America holds a shield bearing thirteen stars and rests a foot upon the head of a chained lion (representing England). The reverse shows the unicorn of the Royal coat of arms of the United Kingdom, prostrate with its horn broken against a rock cliff. The inscription reads, “Tyrannis virtute repulsa / sub Galliae auspiciis,” which translates to “Tyranny repelled by valor / under the auspices of France”,

Though Adams wrote ironically to his wife Abigail of the Dutch love for medals as a method of celebrating events, he wrote very respectfully to Holtzhey himself and thanked him for his work and explanation of the designs.

Legacy
Together with his father Holtzhey wrote a catalog of 73 historical medals in 1755, Catalogus der Medailles en Gedenkpenningen, betrekking hebbende op de voornaamste historien der vereenigde Nederlanden, Amst. 1755, which was sadly far from complete, though it was quoted in several books on medals. Though he married twice he remained childless, and he was succeeded as mint master in Utrecht by his pupil David van der Kellen Sr., who continued his tradition of striking historical medals for anniversaries and popular events. In 1809 his collection was sold at auction for 4000 guilders.

References

External sources
 G. van der Meer, 'Prijspenningen van Nederlandsche geleerde genootschappen in de achttiende eeuw', Werkgroep Achttiende Eeuw (1983), p. 1-20 in the DBNL
website of Teylers Museum on Holtzhey's prize medals designed for the Teylers Stichting.
website of Teylers Museum on Holtzhey's accounts paid by the stichting in the museum's archive.

1729 births
1808 deaths
Dutch medallists
Artists from Amsterdam
Teylers Museum